Mercy Medical Center is a hospital located in Baltimore, Maryland. Mercy has been recognized as the #2 hospital in the State of Maryland for 2014-15 by U.S. News & World Report.

Current Facility
The landmark McCauley Tower building of the hospital along St. Paul Place to the west of North Calvert Street, opened in 1963 and is located at 301 St. Paul Place. Its form was quite unusual in that the upper two-thirds of the building of tan/light brown bricks spread out fifty yards out above the lower five stories.  Additionally the later Mary Bunting Tower skyscraper buildings and annexes further north along the east side of St. Paul Place and North Calvert Street to East Pleasant Street, and to the next block at the elevated Orleans Street Viaduct (over Bath Street) were built in the mid-2010s with additional parking garages attached to the east along Guilford Avenue.

History

Founding
Historically, Mercy was founded as "Baltimore City Hospital" by six Sisters of Mercy, a Roman Catholic order of nuns, on November 11, 1874, which was a merger of the Washington University School of Medicine [not the same institution with a similar name now located in St. Louis, Missouri]; (also known as a later re-incarnation of the Washington Medical College of Baltimore and the College of Physicians and Surgeons,  earlier institutions from 1870, that the Sisters had been invited to assist with by local doctors.  Their buildings were located at the northwest corner of North Calvert and East Saratoga Streets, among which was a former schoolhouse and consisted of a medical dispensary under the later name of "Baltimore City Hospital" ((not to be confused with an earlier Baltimore Town and later municipal "Almshouse" (founded 1773), which relocated to the eastern city limits and became known as the "Bay View Asylum", and later known by the 1930s as "The Baltimore City Hospitals" off Eastern Avenue beyond the outer city neighborhoods of Highlandtown, Canton and Greektown. It was west of the large suburban areas in Baltimore County of Essex, Middle River, and northwest of Dundalk and Sparrows Point. It was acquired from the City in  1984 by Johns Hopkins Hospital and Johns Hopkins University at the beginning of their joint expanded statewide medical system, and renamed "Francis Scott Key Medical Center", then later Johns Hopkins Bayview Medical Center)). A collection of Baltimore City Hospitals' papers can be found at the National Library of Medicine.

Expansion
Initially, the Mercy Hospital expanded to the north with buildings along Calvert Street towards East Pleasant Street. By the mid-1950s, the Hospital acquired the structures to the west along St. Paul Street/former Courtland Street, north of East Saratoga and south of East Pleasant Streets, which formerly housed the offices of the Baltimore City Department of Public Welfare (later known as Social Services).  These buildings had served the poor and destitute of Baltimore for several decades and a newer renovated structure was now being created on Greenmount Avenue near East Oliver Streets by the Green Mount Cemetery in the early 1950s. So the old Public Welfare structures were available for Mercy to expand into temporarily and later to replace with a new landmark symbol and tower.

Eventually the Mercy medical hospital and nursing school expanded to the west along East Saratoga Street to the neighboring Saint Paul Place

References

External links
 Baltimore City Hospitals Records (1952-1965)—National Library of Medicine finding aid

Downtown Baltimore
Hospitals in Baltimore
Hospital buildings completed in 1963
Catholic hospitals in North America